Chuwabo (Echuwabo), also spelled Cuabo and Txuwabo, is a Bantu language spoken along the central coast of Mozambique.

Maindo, though customarily considered a separate language, is close enough to be a dialect of Chuwabo.

References

 

Makua languages
Languages of Mozambique